Heidenheim Heideköpfe is a German baseball and softball club from Heidenheim an der Brenz, Baden-Württemberg.  The club was established in 1992 as the baseball arm of Heidenheimer Sportbund (SB), a parent organization that contains several clubs in different sports, and played its first season in 1993 in the Baden-Württemberg District League. The first men's team was promoted to the first division of the Baseball Bundesliga for the 2001 season and has played there in every season since, winning championships in 2009, 2015, 2017 and 2019. 

The team's name means "heathland's head," a reference to Heidenheim's coat of arms. The team mascot is Heiko, a life-sized teddy bear made by the Margarete-Steiff-Company. 

The club participated in the European Champion Cup Final Four in 2010, losing 4-1 in the semifinals to Serie A1 club Telemarket Rimini. In 2019 the CEB Cup was won ahead of the Czech club Draci Brno and the French club Montigny Cougars.

Club Structure
The full club consists of 7 teams:
1st Men's Baseball, Bundesliga's 1st Division
2nd Men's Baseball, Bundesliga's 2nd Division
3rd Men's Baseball, Bezirksliga
Student
Youth
Juniors
Softball Fun-(Fan-)Team

Heideköpfe claims Voith AG, Hartmann AG, Heidenheim Volksbank eG, and Stadtwerke Heidenheim AG among its corporate sponsors.

Field
Heideköpfe play their home games at New Heideköpfe Ballpark. Completed in 2002, the field is 98 meters (322 ft) down the lines and 120 meters (394 ft) to center.  It has fixed seating of 500 and a grassy picnic area that can accommodate an additional 2,500 spectators. The team claims an average attendance of 350, with a peak home attendance of 1,500 on August 21, 1994 against the Stuttgart Reds, prior to the construction of the new ballpark.

Season by Season Performance (1st Bundesliga)

References

External links
 Official Site

Baseball teams in Germany